Ifs is a commune in the Calvados department in the Normandy region in northwestern France.

Population

Administration

Mayors of Ifs

International relations
Ifs is twinned with:
  Ilfracombe, Devon, England
  Niederwerrn, Germany

Notable people
 Robert Tournières (1668-1752), portrait painter, pupil of Hyacinthe Rigaud
 Sabine Devieilhe (b. 1985), operatic soprano

See also
Communes of the Calvados department

References

External links

Ifs website

Communes of Calvados (department)
Calvados communes articles needing translation from French Wikipedia